Jenny Island or Isla Juanita is a rocky island  long which rises to , lying  east of Cape Alexandra, the southeastern extremity of Adelaide Island, in northern Marguerite Bay.

First Visitors
The island was discovered by the French Antarctic Expedition (1908-1910) under Jean-Baptiste Charcot and named by him for the wife of Sub-Lieutenant Maurice Bongrain, French Navy, second officer  of the expedition. Charcot had climbed to the top of the islands ice cliffs to understand that the outlying Adelaide Island was indeed an island. Following he had made expeditions into nearby havens to find a wintering harbor but each time was forced to return to Jenny Island until eventually he moved on.

Wildlife
From time to time Southern elephant seals  take refuge on the island to bathe in the sun and the occasional penguin visits also.

See also
 Composite Antarctic Gazetteer
 List of Antarctic and sub-Antarctic islands
 List of Antarctic islands south of 60° S
 SCAR
 Territorial claims in Antarctica

References

External links

Islands of Adelaide Island